The Suzuki GSX-R/4 is a concept car made by Suzuki in 2001. It has a mid-mounted,  DOHC engine taken from the company's flagship motorcycle, the GSX-1300R Hayabusa. Designed as a showcase for technology, the GSX-R/4 was never meant for production. It had upscale features for its time, such as GPS navigation. Alongside the GSX-R/4, Suzuki presented the Formula Hayabusa, an open wheel race car concept, also using the  motorcycle engine.

References

 
 
 

Concept cars
GSX-R 4